Meritus University was the Canadian brand name of a for-profit university owned and operated by the Apollo Group in the United States, the owners of the University of Phoenix. The offices of the company were located in New Brunswick, Canada. On January 24, 2011, citing how "enrollment will continue to be insufficient to sustain the required quality academic and student service infrastructure we and our students demand", Meritus University announced its closure, with their last classes having been held on March 14, 2011. Students’ academic records were transferred to the University of Phoenix.

Programs
Meritus University offered undergraduate degree and master's degree programs which were recognized by the New Brunswick Department of Post-Secondary Education, Training and Labour.

School of Business
 Bachelor of Business Administration (BBA) degree program with specializations in Communications, Finance, Global Management, Hospitality Management, Human Resources Management, Integrated Supply Chain Management, Management, and Marketing.
 Master of Business Administration (MBA) degree program with specializations in Global Management, Health Care Management, Human Resources Management, Information and Communications Technology Management, and Marketing.

School of Information Technology
 Bachelor of Information Technology Management (BITM) degree program with specializations in Communication and Information Management, Digital Media Management, and Human Interface and Systems Management.

See also 
 Higher education in New Brunswick

References

External links
 

Educational institutions established in 2008
2008 establishments in Canada
Universities in Canada